Mendawai is an Austronesian language spoken along the lower course of the Arut River in West Kotawaringin Regency, Central Kalimantan, Indonesia. It is at the mutually unintelligible end of a dialect continuum with Ngaju. Mendawai and Ngaju share c. 70% of their basic vocabulary.

Vocabulary

References 

West Barito languages
Languages of Indonesia